This is a list of villages in Perambalur district, in the state of Tamil Nadu, India. Its headquarters is the town of Perambalur. Perambalur District comprises Perambalur proper and a number of neighbouring towns and villages with gram panchayats, some encompassing smaller settlements known as hamlets.

A
Adhanur
Aduthurai
Agaram
Agaram Segur
Aiyinapuram
Alambadi
Allinagaram
Ammapalayam
Andhur
Andikurumbalur
Annamangalam
Anukkur
Appapalayam
Aranarai
Arumbavur
Arunagirimangalam
Asur
Athiyur
Ayyalur
 Ayyikudi
B
Bommanapadi
Brahmadesam
Bujangarayanallur

C
Chathiramanai
Chatramanai
Chettikulam
Chinna Venmani

D
Devaiyur

E
Elambalur
Elanthalapatty
Elanthankuzhi
Elumur
Eraiyur
Esanai
Eachampatti
Eraiyasamuthiram

G
Gudalur

I
Irur

K
 kaarukudi
K.Pudur
Kadur
KAIKALATHUR
Kalanivasal
Koneripalayam
Kalarampatti
Kalarampatti
Kallai
Kalpadi
Kannapadi
Karai
Kariyanur
Kavulpalayam
Keelakanavai
Keelakarai
Keelamathur
Keelaperambalur
Keelapuliyur
Kilumathur
Kolakkanatham
Kolappadi
Kolathur
Koneripalayam
Koothur
Kottarai
Kovilpalayam
Kunnam
Kurumbalur
Kumarabalayam Kudikkadu
Kurumbapalayam
Kurur

L
Ladapuram
Labbaikudikadu

M
 Malavarayanallur
Malayaloapatti
Mettu kalinga raya nallur / M.K.City / Ashok Samydurai
Mavilangai
Melamathur
Melapuliyur
Mettupalayam
Mettur
Moolakadu
Moongilpady

N
Nakkasalem
Namaiyur
Nannai
Naranamangalam
Nathakkadu
Nattarmangalam
Navalur
Neikuppai (Vepanthatai)
Neikuppai
Nochiam
Nochikulam
Nothapur

O
Ogalur
Olaippadi
Othiyam

P
Padalur
Palaiyur
Palayam
Palaya virali patty
Pandagapady
Palla kalinga Raya Nallur / Ashok Samydurai
Paravai
Pasumbalur
Pennakonam
Peraiyur
Peraiyur
Perali
Periyavadakkari
Periyavenmani
Perumathur
Peryaammapalayam
Pilimisai
Pillangulam
Pimbalur
Ponnagram
Poolambadi
Pudunaduvalur
Pudunaduvalur
Puduvettakudi
Pudukurrichi
R
Ramalingapuram
Renganathapuram

S
Sathanur
Sengunam
Sillakudi
Siruganpur
Sirugudal
Sirumathur
Sirumathur Kudikadu
Siruvachur
Siruvayalur
Sithali
Sokkanatha Puram
senjeri

T
T.Kalathur
Thaluthalai
Thambiranpatty
Thenur
Therani
Thevaiyur
Thimmur
Thirumandurai
Thiruvalandurai
Thondamandurai
Thondapady
Thungapuram
Thuraimangalam

U
Udumbiam

V
V.Kalathur
Vadakkalur
Vadakkumadevi
Vaithiyanathapuram
Valikandapuram
Varagupadi
Varagur
Vashistapuram
Vayalapady
Velur, Perambalur
Venbavur
Vengalam
Veppanthattai
Venganur

Z
Z.Athur
Zamin peraiyur

AGARAM SEEGOOR -AMBETHKAR NAGAR

 
Tamil Nadu-related lists
Lists of villages in India